Langeskavlstind is a mountain in Vang Municipality in Innlandet county, Norway. The mountain is surrounded by several other notable mountains including Uranostinden to the west, Storegut to the east, Høgbrothøgdi and Langeskavlen to the southeast, and Falketinden to the southwest. The mountain has a large glacier located on its west, north, and east sides.

See also
List of mountains of Norway by height

References

Vang, Innlandet
Mountains of Innlandet